Joseph Sam Beeler (November 26, 1921 in Dallas, Texas – October 8, 2002) was an infielder in Major League Baseball. He played in three games for the Cincinnati Reds during the 1944 baseball season.

External links

1921 births
2002 deaths
Cincinnati Reds players
Major League Baseball infielders
Baseball players from Dallas
Minor league baseball managers
Tucson Cowboys players
Columbia Reds players
Montgomery Rebels players
Birmingham Barons players
Syracuse Chiefs players
Tulsa Oilers (baseball) players
Lamesa Lobos players
Gainesville Owls players
Dallas Eagles players
Galveston White Caps players
Port Arthur Sea Hawks players
Plainview Ponies players
Oklahoma City Indians players
Wichita Falls Spudders players
Corpus Christi Clippers players
Amarillo Gold Sox players